The Sanxia Square(Simplified Chinese:三峡广场; pinyin:Sānxiá Guǎngchǎng; meaning Three Gorges Square) is located in the downtown Shapingba, 80,000 square meter in area, and has a form of cross. It is consist of 4 parts: the garden of the Three Gorges landscape(三峡景观园),  the garden of sculptures(名人雕塑园), the garden of green art(绿色艺术园), and the street of culture and commerce(商业文化街).

Shapingba District
Squares in Chongqing